Mount Woolley is a mountain in Alberta, Canada, located in the Sunwapta River Valley of Jasper National Park, 1½ km south of Diadem Peak and is part of Winston Churchill Range of the Canadian Rockies.

History
The mountain was named in 1898 by J. Norman Collie after Herman Woolley. Woolley, a former football player, climbed extensively with Collie during his 1898 and 1902 expeditions into the Canadian Rockies.

The first ascent was made in 1925 by a Japanese team consisting of S. Hashimoto, H. Hatano, T. Hayakawa, Y. Maki, Y. Mita and N. Okabe. They were guided by Hans Fuhrer, H. Kohler and J. Weber.

Geology

Mount Woolley is composed of sedimentary rock laid down from the Precambrian to Jurassic periods. Formed in shallow seas, this sedimentary rock was pushed east and over the top of younger rock during the Laramide orogeny.

Climate

Based on the Köppen climate classification, Mount Woolley is located in a subarctic climate zone with cold, snowy winters, and mild summers.

See also

Geography of Alberta
List of mountains of Canada

References

Three-thousanders of Alberta
Winston Churchill Range
Mountains of Jasper National Park